Surf City may refer to:

Music 
 "Surf City" (song), written by Brian Wilson of the Beach Boys, and Jan Berry of Jan and Dean
 Surf City (band), New Zealand band

Trademarks 
 "Surf City, USA", a title at the center of a trademark dispute between two California cities

Places 
 Huntington Beach, California, legally trademarked as Surf City, USA
 Surf City, New Jersey
 Surf City, North Carolina
 Santa Cruz, California, colloquially referred to as Surf City